The 2017–18 LSU Lady Tigers basketball team will represent Louisiana State University during the 2017–18 NCAA Division I women's basketball season college basketball season. The Lady Tigers, led by seventh-year head coach Nikki Fargas, will play their home games at Pete Maravich Assembly Center and were members of the Southeastern Conference. They finished the season 19–10, 11–5 in SEC play to finish in a 4 way tie for fourth place. As a 4th seed, they lost in the quarterfinals of the SEC women's tournament to Texas A&M. They received an at-large bid to the NCAA women's tournament where got upset by Central Michigan in the first round.

Roster

Schedule and results

|-
!colspan=12 style="background:#33297B; color:#FDD023;"| Exhibition

|-
!colspan=12 style="background:#33297B; color:#FDD023;"| Non-conference regular season

|-
!colspan=12 style="background:#33297B; color:#FDD023;"| SEC regular season

  
|-
!colspan=12 style="background:#33297B;" |SEC Women's Tournament

|-
!colspan=12 style="background:#33297B;" |NCAA Women's Tournament

Source:

Rankings
2017–18 NCAA Division I women's basketball rankings

References

External links
 Official Team Website

LSU Lady Tigers basketball seasons
LSU
LSU L
LSU L
LSU